Patrick Husbands (born May 22, 1973) is a Barbadian jockey in Thoroughbred horse racing. The son of a jockey, he began riding as a young boy, turning professional in his home country where he rode successfully until emigrating to Toronto, Ontario in 1994. In 1990 he became the youngest jockey to win the prestigious Barbados Gold Cup at just 16 years, 9 months on his mount Vardar.

Racing out of Woodbine Racetrack, in 2003 Husbands won the Canadian Triple Crown aboard the colt Wando and that year became his breakout year. Among his other notable wins, he rode Numerous Times to victory in the $1 million 2001 Woodbine Mile and Exciting Story in that same year's Metropolitan Handicap at Belmont Park in New York. He rode Arch Hall to three straight wins between 2004 and 2006 in the Sir Barton Stakes. In 2007, he was the regular rider on Canadian Horse of the Year, Sealy Hill.

Patrick Husbands was voted the Sovereign Award for Outstanding Jockey a then unprecedented four straight years between 1999 and 2002. He made his first Kentucky Derby appearance in 2006 riding Seaside Retreat for trainer Mark Casse. In 2008 he won his fifth riding title at Woodbine Racetrack and was voted the Sovereign Award for Outstanding Jockey for a record-tying sixth time.

On October 4, 2009 Patrick Husbands earned his 2,000th career victory at Woodbine Racetrack.

On June 5, 2014 it was announced the Husband would be the 30th winner of the Avelino Gomez Memorial Award. The award recognizes jockeys who are Canadian-born, Canadian-raised, or a regular in the country for more than five years, who have made significant contributions to the sport of thoroughbred horse racing.

On June 18, 2016 Patrick Husbands earned his 3,000th career victory at Woodbine Racetrack.

Husbands makes his home in Brampton, Ontario. He has a brother (Simon Husbands) and a nephew- apprentice (Terry Husbands) who are also jockeys.

Year-end charts

References

 Patrick Husbands at the NTRA

Avelino Gomez Memorial Award winners
Barbadian emigrants to Canada
Barbadian jockeys
Canadian jockeys
Sportspeople from Brampton
Sportspeople from Bridgetown
Sovereign Award winners
1973 births
Living people